Agonopterix cervariella is a moth of the family Depressariidae. It is found in France, Switzerland, Austria, Italy and North Macedonia.

The wingspan is 23–25 mm.

The larvae feed on Peucedanum cervaria.

References

Moths described in 1884
Agonopterix
Moths of Europe